Golcharmu (also Romanized as Golcharmū) is a village in Safa Khaneh Rural District, in the Central District of Shahin Dezh County, West Azerbaijan Province, Iran. At the 2006 census, its population was 248, in 50 families.

References 

Populated places in Shahin Dezh County